Pavlína Horálková (born 24 May 1991) is a Czech ice hockey player and member of the Czech national team, currently playing in the Zhenskaya Hockey League (ZhHL) with Biryusa Krasnoyarsk.

Ice hockey career
Horálková represented the Czech Republic in the women's ice hockey tournament at the 2022 Winter Olympics in Beijing and at the IIHF Women's World Championship in 2016, 2017, 2019, 2021, and 2022. She was part of the history-making Czech roster that won the country's first medal at the Women's World Championship, claiming bronze in 2022.

Ball hockey career
Horálková is also an elite ball hockey player and has represented the Czech Republic at the Ball Hockey World Championship for more than a decade, winning a gold medal in 2017, silver in 2022, and bronze medals in 2009, 2011, 2015, and 2019.

References

External links
 
 

1991 births
Living people
Ball hockey players
Biryusa Krasnoyarsk players
Czech women's ice hockey defencemen
Czech expatriate ice hockey players in Russia
European Women's Hockey League players
Ice hockey players at the 2022 Winter Olympics
Olympic ice hockey players of the Czech Republic
People from Benešov
Sportspeople from the Central Bohemian Region